"Get It All" is a song performed by American R&B singer Sean Garrett and features rapper Nicki Minaj. It was released as the lead single from Garrett's debut mixtape The Inkwell.

Background
In an interview with Seattle Post-Intelligencer Garrett discussed the song and Nicki's contribution to the song.

"I played Nicki a couple of records off my album, and there was one that I wanted her to get on. She heard ‘Get It All’ and went crazy, like, ‘I was thinking I want to get on that,’ and I was thinking the same thing! She really delivered big for me, and in turn, I started playing her some other records. I played her this one that I thought could be huge for her, and that record was ‘Massive Attack.’ I played it again, and she said, ‘That’s the direction that I want my album to be in.’”

Critical reception
Nathan S. of the DJ Booth gave the song a negative review stating "Garrett, whose songwriting skills are undeniable (see Mario’s Break Up), isn’t exactly displaying the full range of his production skills on Get It All - there’s a fine line between minimalistic and simplistic, and this feels like the former - and his vocal skills don’t exactly impress." and even commented on being overshadowed by Minaj on his own song.

Music video
The video is directed by Gil Green. Garret filmed his scenes in March 2010 while Minaj filmed her scenes in April 2010.

The music video debuted on June 22, 2010. The video begins with Garrett playing the intro of "Feel Love" (featuring Drake, also off The Inkwell) as if it was a school assignment and begins Get It All once his love interest walks in. The entire video is cut and spliced to fit the piano beats of the song. Throughout the video Garrett shows a timeline with his love interest from when he was in junior-high where he has a younger boy play him and then is shown in current day wearing the same clothes. While in the schools gymnasium, Tyga makes a cameo and appears behind Garrett in the bleachers while Minaj walks in and raps her verse. After Minaj's verse, Garrett is shown singing on top of a stage and with his love interest leaning on his car. As the video continues, clips of the entire music video are shown until the end.

Charts

References

2010 singles
Hip hop songs
Nicki Minaj songs
Songs written by Sean Garrett
Songs written by Nicki Minaj
Music videos directed by Gil Green
2010 songs
Song recordings produced by Bangladesh (record producer)